Woman's World (also known as A Woman's World) is a 1954 American Technicolor drama film about corporate America directed by Jean Negulesco and starring Clifton Webb, June Allyson, Van Heflin, Lauren Bacall, Fred MacMurray, Arlene Dahl and Cornel Wilde. The screenplay concerns three men who compete for the top job at a large company.

Plot
When the general manager of Gifford Motors dies, company owner Ernest Gifford (Clifton Webb) invites the three candidates for the position to New York City so he can personally evaluate them and their wives. Bill and Katie Baxter (Cornel Wilde and June Allyson) are a loving couple from Kansas City. Elizabeth Burns (Lauren Bacall) is becoming estranged from her driven husband Sidney (Fred MacMurray) because his work is consuming him and undermining his health; she fears a promotion would eventually kill him. Jerry Talbot (Van Heflin), who has a sexy, ambitious wife, Carol (Arlene Dahl), rounds out the trio.

As time goes by, Katie is shown to be a bit of a klutz, both physically and socially. On the other hand, Elizabeth is both poised and gracious. Despite their differences, she and Katie get along well. When the couples are unexpectedly invited to spend the weekend at the estate of Gifford's sister Evelyn Andrews, (Margalo Gillmore), Elizabeth generously helps Katie buy appropriate clothing on a limited budget.

Meanwhile, Carol does her best to "help" her husband by playing up to a seemingly appreciative Gifford at every opportunity, despite Jerry's demands that she stop interfering. It becomes clear to Gifford that the best candidate and the most suitable wife are unfortunately not married to each other. He announces that he will reveal his decision after dinner. Carol makes one last brazen attempt to influence his choice and is surprised to learn that, while Jerry is Gifford's favorite, he will not get the job because of a fatal handicap. When she informs her husband and also how she helped him in the past, Jerry proves that he got at least one big promotion on his own merits, not because of her charms. He then says to her that they are through and tells her to pack and leave. When Gifford finds out, he is pleased. He had hoped that Jerry would see his wife for what she was. Gifford congratulates his new general manager for passing the test. The other two couples are relieved.

Cast
 Clifton Webb as Ernest Gifford
 June Allyson as Katie Baxter
 Van Heflin as Jerry Talbot
 Lauren Bacall as Elizabeth Burns
 Fred MacMurray as Sidney Burns
 Arlene Dahl as Carol Talbot
 Cornel Wilde as Bill Baxter
 Elliott Reid as Tony Andrews, Gifford's nephew
 Margalo Gillmore as Evelyn Andrews, Gifford's sister

Production
The film was based on a magazine story May the Best Wife Win. 20th Century Fox bought the film rights, intending to make a movie along the lines of A Letter to Three Wives and All About Eve.

In January 1952 Julian Blaustein was to produce and the film was going to star Jeanne Crain, Corinne Calvet, Marilyn Monroe and Joanne Dru. In April 1953 Claude Binyon was going to direct and Raymond Klune produce with Jeanne Crain and possibly Gloria Grahame to star. Other castings mentioned included  Susan Hayward and Michael Rennie. By December 1953 Binyon had finished the script.

In January 1954 producer Charles Brackett announced the team of Lindsay and Crouse would write the script. Brackett wanted to cast six stars and aimed to start filming in April.

Location filming started in New York in February while the script was being written. By this stage the director was Jean Negulesco and the stars were intended to be Clifton Webb, June Allyson, Eleanor Parker, Glenn Ford, Lauren Bacall and Charlton Heston. There was also a car, the "Ford of Tomorrow", built by Ford at a cost of $180,000. There were three weeks location filming, then some location work at a Detroit auto plant, before filming was to start at a studio later.

By April the stars signed were Clifton Webb, Jean Peters, Gloria Grahame, June Allyson and Cornel Wilde. Wilde did the film as the last movie under an old commitment with Fox. Eventually Van Heflin and Fred MacMurray joined the cast, and Lauren Bacall replaced Grahame and Arlene Dahl replaced Peters. Filming started 3 May.

See also
 Executive Suite, a similar film released the same year, with June Allyson again playing a reluctant, but loyal wife

References

External links
 
 
 
 

1954 films
1954 drama films
American business films
Films directed by Jean Negulesco
Films scored by Cyril J. Mockridge
Films set in New York City
Films produced by Charles Brackett
20th Century Fox films
1950s business films
CinemaScope films
American drama films
1950s English-language films
1950s American films